Pesochny (masculine), Pesochnaya (feminine), or Pesochnoye (neuter) is the name of several inhabited localities in Russia.

Arkhangelsk Oblast
As of 2010, one rural locality in Arkhangelsk Oblast bears this name:
Pesochny, Arkhangelsk Oblast, a settlement in Kozminsky Selsoviet of Lensky District

Belgorod Oblast
As of 2010, one rural locality in Belgorod Oblast bears this name:
Pesochny, Belgorod Oblast, a khutor in Starooskolsky District

Kaliningrad Oblast
As of 2010, two rural localities in Kaliningrad Oblast bear this name:
Pesochnoye, Bagrationovsky District, Kaliningrad Oblast, a settlement in Gvardeysky Rural Okrug of Bagrationovsky District
Pesochnoye, Pravdinsky District, Kaliningrad Oblast, a settlement under the administrative jurisdiction of the town of district significance of Pravdinsk in Pravdinsky District

Kostroma Oblast
As of 2010, two rural localities in Kostroma Oblast bear this name:
Pesochny, Kostroma Oblast, a settlement in Tikhonovskoye Settlement of Vokhomsky District
Pesochnoye, Kostroma Oblast, a village in Baksheyevskoye Settlement of Kostromskoy District

Krasnoyarsk Krai
As of 2010, one rural locality in Krasnoyarsk Krai bears this name:
Pesochny, Krasnoyarsk Krai, a settlement in Yermakovsky Selsoviet of Yermakovsky District

Kursk Oblast
As of 2010, two rural localities in Kursk Oblast bear this name:
Pesochny, Kursk Oblast, a khutor in Ivanchikovsky Selsoviet of Lgovsky District
Pesochnoye, Kursk Oblast, a khutor in Gostomlyansky Selsoviet of Medvensky District

Leningrad Oblast
As of 2010, one rural locality in Leningrad Oblast bears this name:
Pesochnoye, Leningrad Oblast, a logging depot settlement in Polyanskoye Settlement Municipal Formation of Vyborgsky District

Mari El Republic
As of 2010, one rural locality in the Mari El Republic bears this name:
Pesochnoye, Mari El Republic, a village in Nezhnursky Rural Okrug of Kilemarsky District

Republic of Mordovia
As of 2010, one rural locality in the Republic of Mordovia bears this name:
Pesochny, Republic of Mordovia, a settlement in Ladsky Selsoviet of Ichalkovsky District

Moscow Oblast
As of 2010, one rural locality in Moscow Oblast bears this name:
Pesochnoye, Moscow Oblast, a village in Uzunovskoye Rural Settlement of Serebryano-Prudsky District

Nizhny Novgorod Oblast
As of 2010, four rural localities in Nizhny Novgorod Oblast bear this name:
Pesochnoye, Semyonov, Nizhny Novgorod Oblast, a village in Pafnutovsky Selsoviet of the town of oblast significance of Semyonov
Pesochnoye, Bogorodsky District, Nizhny Novgorod Oblast, a village in Aleshkovsky Selsoviet of Bogorodsky District
Pesochnoye, Knyagininsky District, Nizhny Novgorod Oblast, a selo in Solovyevsky Selsoviet of Knyagininsky District
Pesochnoye, Voskresensky District, Nizhny Novgorod Oblast, a village in Staroustinsky Selsoviet of Voskresensky District

Oryol Oblast
As of 2010, one rural locality in Oryol Oblast bears this name:
Pesochnoye, Oryol Oblast, a selo in Pesochensky Selsoviet of Verkhovsky District

Saint Petersburg
As of 2010, one urban locality in Saint Petersburg bears this name:
Pesochny, Saint Petersburg, a municipal settlement in Kurortny District

Samara Oblast
As of 2010, two rural localities in Samara Oblast bear this name:
Pesochny, Samara Oblast, a settlement in Syzransky District
Pesochnoye, Samara Oblast, a selo in Bezenchuksky District

Tula Oblast
As of 2010, one rural locality in Tula Oblast bears this name:
Pesochnoye, Tula Oblast, a village in Aransky Rural Okrug of Arsenyevsky District

Vladimir Oblast
As of 2010, two rural localities in Vladimir Oblast bear this name:
Pesochnoye, Vladimir Oblast, a village in Suzdalsky District
Pesochnaya, Russia, a village in Alexandrovsky District

Vologda Oblast
As of 2010, one rural locality in Vologda Oblast bears this name:
Pesochnoye, Vologda Oblast, a settlement in Kubensky Selsoviet of Vologodsky District

Yaroslavl Oblast
As of 2010, two rural localities in Yaroslavl Oblast bear this name:
Pesochnoye, Rostovsky District, Yaroslavl Oblast, a selo in Shurskolsky Rural Okrug of Rostovsky District
Pesochnoye, Rybinsky District, Yaroslavl Oblast, a settlement in Pesochensky Rural Okrug of Rybinsky District